is a train station located in Kurume, Fukuoka.

Lines
Nishi-Nippon Railroad
Amagi Line

Platforms

Adjacent stations

Surrounding area 
 Ōki Post Office
 Ōki Elementary School
 Ōki Nursery
 Ōki Clinic

Railway stations in Fukuoka Prefecture
Railway stations in Japan opened in 1921